Absolutely is Sister Hazel's sixth studio album. It was released on October 10, 2006 by Adrenaline/Wandering Hazel Records. It is Sister Hazel's first album since departing from their previous record label, Sixthman. "Mandolin Moon", was the first single. The album was leaked to torrent websites on August 10, 2006. The leaked version was an advance copy of the CD and featured a short spoken-word track in place of "Hello It's Me."

Track listing
"Shame" (Newell, Carrier) 3:41
"Mandolin Moon (featuring Shawn Mullins)" (Newell, Beres, Block)       3:34
"Meet Me in the Memory (featuring Richard Marx)" (Block, Marx) 3:23
"Beautiful High" (Brice, Copeland, Lynch) 3:07
"Hey Hey" (Block) 3:07
"Hello It's Me" (Block) 4:03
"Tear by Tear" (Block) 5:27
"Where Do You Go" (Block) 4:03
"Anyway" (Newell, Carrier) 3:47
"This Kind of Love" (Copeland, Lynch) 3:36
"Truth Is" (Block) 4:25
"One Time" (Beres, Block) 3:35
"Everything Else Disappears" (Block) 3:50

Bonus Tracks
All of these 4 bonus tracks were released the following year on BAM! Volume 1:

"Little Black Heart" (iTunes Bonus Track)
"Cant Get You Off My Mind" (Limited Edition Online Bonus Track. Also found as a hidden track at the end of Track 13 on the initial pressing that is referred to as the Limited Edition Track.)
"On Your Mind" (Yahoo Online Bonus Track)
"Wrong the Right Way" (Rhapsody Bonus Track)

Personnel
Ken Block - lead vocals, acoustic guitar
Jett Beres - bass, harmony vocals
Andrew Copeland - rhythm guitar, vocals
Ryan Newell - lead and slide guitar, harmony vocals
Mark Trojanowski - drums

References 

2006 albums
Albums produced by Richard Marx
Sister Hazel albums